The 2017 Badminton Asia Mixed Team Championships were held at the Nguyen Du Cultural Sport Club in Ho Chi Minh City, Vietnam, on 14–19 February 2017 and were organised by Vietnam Badminton Federation and Ho Chi Minh City Badminton Association.

Medalists

Group stage

Group A

Group B

Group C

Group D

Knockout stage

Quarterfinals

Semifinals

Final

References

External links
ROBOT Badminton Asia Mixed Team Championships 2017

2017
Asia Champ
Badminton Asia Team Championships
International sports competitions hosted by Vietnam
Asia